Elke Felicetti (born 11 August 1970) is an Italian speed skater. She competed in two events at the 1992 Winter Olympics.

References

External links
 

1970 births
Living people
Italian female speed skaters
Olympic speed skaters of Italy
Speed skaters at the 1992 Winter Olympics
Sportspeople from Bolzano